Jonah Kirsten Sorrentino (born June 26, 1975), better known by his stage name KJ-52, is a Christian rapper from Tampa, Florida. The "KJ" part of his name refers to his old rap alias, "King J. Mac," a name which he later described in one of his podcasts as "horribly cheesy." "52", which is pronounced "five two", not "fifty-two", is a reference to the Biblical story of Jesus feeding the multitude with five loaves and two fish, which is also sung about in his song "Push Up" from The Yearbook and in the "KJ Five Two" on It's Pronounced 'Five Two. He was awarded the Rap/Hip Hop Recorded Song of the Year for "Never Look Away" and Rap/Hip Hop Album of the Year at the GMA Dove Awards of 2007. On July 28, 2009, KJ-52 released "End of My Rope", which is the first single for his album Five-Two Television.

Works
In 2002, Sorrentino released his second album, Collaborations. The album's title referred to the numerous contributions made to the album by guest artists, including Pillar, John Reuben and Thousand Foot Krutch. Collaborations also represented his first nomination for a Dove Award, for "Rap/Hip Hop/Dance Album of the Year" in 2003.

KJ-52 has won four Dove Awards, three in the "Rap/Hip Hop Album of the Year" category. He took the 2004 award for It’s Pronounced Five Two, the 2006 award for Behind the Musik (A Boy Named Jonah), and the 2007 award for Remixed. He received an additional honor in 2007, for "Never Look Away" from Behind the Musik, in the "Rap/Hip Hop Recorded Song" category. KJ never tried out for American Idol, but suggested such in his song "Fivetweezy".

In October 2008, he released his album, The Yearbook: The Missing Pages, a re-release of his album, The Yearbook. It comes with the original record with a slip over cover that has a code to download the 13 songs.

2009 Dove Awards
Another productive year for KJ-52 as he was awarded with "Rap/Hip Hop Song of the Year" for "Do Yo Thang"; The Yearbook; KJ-52; Jonah Sorrentino; BEC Recordings/Uprok

In 2009, he released "Five-Two Television", and album covering a variety of themes and rap styles. It is his first album in which autotune is used, a controversial step among his fans. The album brings us the (fictitious) story of Chris Carlino, a man who has ruined his life, through a series of interludes. As usual for KJ-52, the album includes both songs with a strong Christian message and songs that are meant only to entertain.

KJ-52 also rapped in the Newsboys cover of "Jesus Freak".

KJ-52 also rapped in the tobyMac remix of the song "One World" on the album Hip-Hope which also includes the KJ-52 remixed song "What You Want".

KJ-52 released Dangerous on April 3, 2012. It mixes hip hop album with quite a bit of synth, and has some pop-electric. The first released single, "Dangerous", is more light rock-pop. The second single is called "Shake Em Up", but is commonly spelled "Shakem Up". It features guest artists such as Canton Jones on "It's Goin Down", Lecrae on "They Like Me", Thi'sl on "Shake Em Up", George Moss on "Do the Bill Cosby", and more. His final track, "Go," is a remake of the Hillsong United song with the same name.

In 2017, KJ-52 released his first independent album "Jonah." The project was over 200% funded through Pledge Music. Following the release of the album, KJ-52 began working on an independent documentary about his life with filmmaker Denver Bailey. The film went on to raise 125% of the goal through kickstarter.  The film was released alongside KJ-52's second independent album titled "Jonah Pt. 2" on February 15, 2018.

In 2019, KJ-52 released What Happened Was, a joint album with CHH producer and 2019 Rapzilla Freshman, PoetiCS. The album features Xay Hill, Jodie Jermaine, Mitch Darrell, V. Rose, Dre Murray, and Dru Bex. The project was coupled with KJ's first book, also titled What Happened Was. Both the album and the book were over 170% funded through Kickstarter.

On November 5, 2019, KJ-52 announced that he would be retiring from music after the release of his next album.

As of January 6, 2020, he joined the pastoral staff of Christian Life Fellowship in Cape Coral, Florida.

He has been married since June 1996. They have three children.

Eminem and "Dear Slim" controversy
KJ-52 was often compared to Eminem, as many called him a "Christian counterpart". One of the most notable mainstream reactions to the Christian hip hop scene was to KJ-52 and his single "Dear Slim", which was written to Eminem in an attempt to reach him with the message of the gospel. The song became famous and controversial among Eminem fans when it was featured on the hit show Total Request Live. KJ-52 began to receive hate mail (including death threats) from Eminem's fans, though KJ-52 claimed that the song was not being disrespectful. The artist addressed it in a follow-up song titled "Dear Slim Pt. 2".

Discography

Side projects and other releases 

 Peace of Mind's self-titled album (2003, BEC)
 Soul Purpose with T.C. (Todd Collins) (2004, BEC)
 KJ-52 Remixed (2006, BEC)
 The Office Prequel Mixtape (2009)
 Guest rap on "Jesus Freak" for the Newsboys' 2010 album Born Again

Charts

Singles

Guest appearances 

Jeremiah Dirt – Plague – "Good Medison" (1998)
Urban D. – The Missin' Element – "The Spittin' Spot" (1999)
Urban D. – The Tranzlation – "We Go Together Like" (2001)
Pillar - Fireproof - "Stay Up" (2002)
Bobby Bishop – Government Name – "Change the Game" (2005)
Zoegirl - With All Of My Heart - Mix of Life (2007)
tobyMac – Hip Hope Hits 2009 – "One World (Liquid Remix)" (2009)
R-Swift – Anthem – "Flava of Forever" (2009)
Newsboys – Born Again – "Jesus Freak" (2010)
Sean Slaughter – The Prototype – "I'm Gone" (2010)
big AL – The Balancing Act – "Lookin' @ Us" (2011)
muzeONE – Cold War – "Lights On" (2011)
Research – Cerca Trova – "The Struggle" (2011)
Jai – Culture Shock – "Incredible (Remix)" (2011)
The Ambassador – Stop the Funeral – "Your Love" (2011)
Canton Jones – The Live Experience – "I Am (Live)" (2012)
E Tizz – What I Gotta Say – "I'm Tellin' 'Em All" (2012)
Rawsrvnt – Love Deluxe – "Jesus Jam" (2012)
Emcee One – Introducing Again for the First Time – "Introducing Again for the First Time" (2012)
Viktory – R4 (Relentless 4ever) – "God Is Amazing" (2012)
George Moss – It’s Time – "Ridin' Windows Up" (2012)
Lincoln Brewster – Joy to the World (A Christmas Collection) – "Little Drummer Boy" (2012)
For a Season – Lion Hearted – EP – "Let It Out" (2013)
V. Rose – Electro-Pop (Deluxe) – "Turn Up Your Light" (2013)
Turnaround – Anxious – "Ghost Town" (2018)

Awards 
GMA Dove Awards

References

External links

American performers of Christian music
Record producers from Florida
BEC Recordings artists
Gotee Records artists
Living people
Performers of Christian hip hop music
Rappers from Florida
1975 births
Musicians from Tampa, Florida
21st-century American rappers